The 1977 Temple Owls football team was an American football team that represented Temple University as an independent during the 1977 NCAA Division I football season. In its eighth season under head coach Wayne Hardin, the team compiled a 5–5–1 record and was outscored by a total of 286 to 229. The team played its home games at Veterans Stadium (four games) and Franklin Field (one game) in Philadelphia.

The team's statistical leaders included Pat Carey with 1,074 passing yards, Anthony Anderson with 756 rushing yards and 66 points scored, and Steve Watson with 573 receiving yards. On September 17, Temple set a new school record with 477 rushing yards in a 42–0 victory over Drake.

Schedule

References

Temple
Temple Owls football seasons
Temple Owl football